is a Japanese footballer who plays as a defender for Vegalta Sendai.

Club statistics
Updated to 6 November 2022.

References

External links
Profile at Vegalta Sendai

 
 

1992 births
Living people
Kwansei Gakuin University alumni
Association football people from Osaka Prefecture
Japanese footballers
J1 League players
J2 League players
J3 League players
Oita Trinita players
Shimizu S-Pulse players
Vegalta Sendai players
Association football defenders